Immolation Tape (stylised in all-lowercase) is the third extended play by Australian alternative rock band Gang of Youths, surprise released on 20 May 2022. It contains re-recorded acoustic versions of three tracks from their preceding third studio album Angel in Realtime, as well as a cover of "Shot in the Arm" by Wilco.

Background and release 
The EP was recorded at a Sirius XM studio in March 2022 for the station's Spectrum Sessions program in the United States following the release of their third studio album, Angel in Realtime (February). On 10 March, the band released their cover of Wilco's "Shot in the Arm" as part of the session.

On 20 May, the band performed their song "Forbearance" live on American late night talk show Jimmy Kimmel Live. Without any prior announcement, Immolation Tape was released digitally on the same day. In a press release, the band said they "just wanted to chuck it out there for a laugh".

The cover artwork was designed by Melbourne-based graphic director Bradley Pinkerton. In an interview with NME, frontman David Le'aupepe revealed the EP was originally to be titled This Is Fucking SiriusXM, but "it didn’t really work" and "was too on the nose".

Music publication TotalNtertainment wrote the "stripped back approach" on the EP "provides a fresh warmth and intimacy to these already emotionally charged songs". On the Wilco cover, the writer claims it is "both fresh and respectful to the original".

Track listing 
All tracks stylised in all-lowercase.

Personnel 
Gang of Youths

 Dave Le'aupepe – vocals, rhythm guitar, writing
 Donnie Borzestowski – drums, writing
 Jung Kim – keyboards, writing
 Max Dunn – bass guitar, writing
 Tom Hobden – violin, writing

Other musicians

 Jay Bennett – writing (4)
 Jeff Tweedy – writing (4)
 John Stirratt – writing (4)
 Shane Mclean – writing (3)
 Richard Woodcraft – engineer
 Nick Etwell – trumpet

References 

Gang of Youths EPs
Indie folk EPs
2022 EPs